The Second Lok Sabha (5 April 1957 – 31 March 1962) was elected after the 1957 Indian general election. The 2nd Lok Sabha lasted its full tenure of five years till 1962.
 
15 sitting members from Rajya Sabha were elected to 2nd Lok Sabha after the Indian general elections, 1957.

Members
 
 Speaker: M. Ananthasayanam Ayyangar (8 March 1956 – 16 April 1962)
 Deputy Speaker:  Sardar Hukam Singh, (20 March 1956 – 31 March 1962)
 Secretary: M. N. Kaul (27 July 1947 – 1 September 1964)

List of members by political party
Members by the political party in 2nd Lok Sabha are given below

See also
Politics of India
List of Indian constituencies
3rd Lok Sabha

References

External links

 Terms of the Lok Sabha
India MPs 1957–1962
1957 establishments in India
1962 disestablishments in India